Midjourney is an artificial intelligence program created by a San Francisco-based independent research lab Midjourney, Inc. Midjourney generates images from natural language descriptions, called "prompts", similar to OpenAI's DALL-E and Stable Diffusion. It is speculated that the underlying technology is based on Stable Diffusion. The tool is currently in open beta, which it entered on July 12, 2022. The Midjourney team is led by David Holz, who co-founded Leap Motion. Holz told The Register in August 2022 that the company was already profitable. Users create artwork with Midjourney using Discord bot commands.

History
Midjourney, Inc. was founded in San Francisco, California by David Holz, co-founder of Leap Motion. The Midjourney image generation platform first entered open beta on July 12, 2022. However, on March 14, 2022, the Discord server launched with a request to post high-quality photographs to Twitter/Reddit for system's training.

The company has been working on improving its algorithms, releasing new versions every few months. Version 2 of their algorithm was launched in April 2022 and version 3 on July 25. On November 5, 2022, the alpha iteration of version 4 was released to users and on March 16, 2023, the beta iteration of version 5 was released.

Functionality
Midjourney is currently only accessible through a Discord bot on their official Discord server, by direct messaging the bot, or by inviting the bot to a third party server. To generate images, users use the  command and type in a prompt; the bot then returns a set of four images. Users may then choose which images they want to upscale. Midjourney is also working on a web interface.

Midjourney has three subscription tiers, and offers a free trial. Generating an image activates the free trial. Trial users can make roughly 25 Jobs before needing to subscribe to continue using it.

Uses
Founder David Holz says he sees artists as customers, not competitors of Midjourney. Holz told The Register that artists use Midjourney for rapid prototyping of artistic concepts to show to clients before starting work themselves. Some artists have accused Midjourney of devaluing original creative work by using it in the training set; Midjourney's terms of service includes a DMCA takedown policy, allowing artists to request their work to be removed from the set if they believe copyright infringement to be evident.

The advertising industry has been quick to embrace AI tools such as Midjourney, DALL-E, and Stable Diffusion, among others. The tools, which enable advertisers to create original content and brainstorm ideas quickly are providing new opportunities such as "custom ads created for individuals, a new way to create special effects, or even making e-commerce advertising more efficient", according to Ad Age.

Notable usage and controversy
The program was used by the British magazine The Economist to create the front cover for an issue in June 2022. In Italy, the leading newspaper Corriere della Sera published a comic created with Midjourney by writer Vanni Santoni in August 2022. Charlie Warzel used Midjourney to generate two images of Alex Jones for Warzel's newsletter in The Atlantic. The use of an AI-generated cover was criticised by people who felt it was taking jobs from artists. Warzel called his action a "mistake" in an article about his decision to use generated images. Last Week Tonight with John Oliver included a 10-minute segment on Midjourney in an episode broadcast in August 2022.

A Midjourney image called Théâtre d'Opéra Spatial won first place in the digital art competition at the 2022 Colorado State Fair. Jason Allen, who wrote the prompt that led Midjourney to generate the image, printed the image onto a canvas and entered it into the competition using the name "Jason M. Allen via Midjourney". Other digital artists were upset by the news. Allen was unapologetic, insisting that he followed the competition's rules. The two category judges were unaware that Midjourney used AI to generate images, although they later said that had they known this, they would have awarded Allen the top prize anyway. This event was similar to one described in the 1958 short story "Thing of Beauty" by Damon Knight. In the story, a man uses a machine to generate the winning image in an art competition. As in the Colorado incident, the judges in the story did not realize that the image was created by machine.

In December 2022, Midjourney was used to create the images in an AI-generated children's book in the span of a weekend. Titled Alice and Sparkle, the book features a young girl who builds a robot that becomes self-aware. The creator, Ammaar Reeshi, spent hours tweaking Midjourney prompts, rejecting hundreds of generated results to ultimately choose 13 illustrations for the book. Both the product and process drew criticism: “the main problem... is that it was trained off of artists’ work. It’s our creations, our distinct styles that we created, that we did not consent to being used," one artist wrote.

Litigation
In January 2023, three artists: Sarah Andersen, Kelly McKernan, and Karla Ortiz filed a copyright infringement lawsuit against Stability AI, Midjourney, and DeviantArt, claiming that these companies have infringed the rights of millions of artists by training AI tools on five billion images scraped from the web without the consent of the original artists.

See also 
 15.ai
 AI Dungeon
 Artificial intelligence art
 Character.ai
 Computer art
 DALL-E
 DreamBooth
 Generative art
 NovelAI
 Stable Diffusion
 Synthography

References

External links

 Official Twitter
 Official Discord server

Text-to-image generation
Deep learning software applications
Unsupervised learning
Art controversies